NOSH-Aspirin is a category of new hybrids of aspirin, bearing both nitric oxide (NO)- and hydrogen sulfide (H2S)- releasing areas. Preliminary studies have found that four NOSH variants, evaluated in eleven different human cancer cell lines, were effective in inhibiting the growth of these cell lines. NOSH-1 was also devoid of any cellular toxicity, and was comparable to aspirin in its anti-inflammatory properties.

References

Aspirin
Nonsteroidal anti-inflammatory drugs
Salicylate esters
Salicylyl esters